Group B of the EuroBasket 2015 took place between 5 and 10 September 2015. The group played all of its games at Mercedes-Benz Arena in Berlin, Germany.

The group was composed of Germany, Iceland, Italy, Serbia, Spain and Turkey. The four best ranked teams advanced to the second round. The group was considered as the toughest group in the tournament.

Standings

All times are local (UTC+2).

5 September

Germany v Iceland

Spain v Serbia

Italy v Turkey

6 September

Serbia v Germany

Iceland v Italy

Turkey v Spain

8 September

Serbia v Iceland

Germany v Turkey

Spain v Italy

9 September

Turkey v Serbia

Italy v Germany

Iceland v Spain

10 September

Serbia v Italy

Germany v Spain

Turkey v Iceland

References

External links
Official website

Group B
International basketball competitions hosted by Germany
2015–16 in German basketball
2015–16 in Spanish basketball
2015–16 in Serbian basketball
2015–16 in Turkish basketball
2015–16 in Italian basketball
2015–16 in Icelandic basketball
Sports competitions in Berlin
2015 in Berlin